General von Kirchbach may refer to:

Günther von Kirchbach (1850–1925), German Imperial Army colonel general
Hans von Kirchbach (1849–1928), German Imperial Army colonel general
Hans-Peter von Kirchbach (born 1941), German Army general
Hugo von Kirchbach (1809–1887), Prussian Army General of the Infantry